Shine On may refer to:

Albums
 Shine On (L.T.D. album), 1980
 Shine On (George Jones album), a 1983 album and song by George Jones
 Shine On (Pink Floyd album), a 1992 box set album by Pink Floyd
 Shine On (Kee Marcello album), 1995
 Shine On (Riot album), 1998
 Shine On (Ralph Stanley album), 2005
 Shine On (Jet album), 2006
 Shine On: The Ultimate Collection, a 2010 album by Laura Branigan
 Shine On (Sarah McLachlan album), 2014
 Shine On, a 1978 album by Climax Blues Band
 Shine On, a 1980 greatest hits album by Kenny Rogers and The First Edition
 Shine On, a 2006 EP by Apoptygma Berzerk
 Shine On, a 2020 album by Adelitas Way
 Shine On, a 2021 album by Paul Oakenfold

Songs
 "Shine On" (Alcazar song), 1999
 "Shine On" (Christine Milton song), 2004
 "Shine On" (Degrees of Motion song), 1994
 "Shine On" (The House of Love song), 1987
 "Shine On" (Humble Pie song), 1971
 "Shine On" (Jet song), 2006
 "Shine On" (The Kooks song), 2008
 "Shine On" (Mike Peters song), 1996
 "Shine On" (R.I.O. song), 2008
 "Shine On" (Ryan Cabrera song), 2005
 "Shine On" (The Screaming Jets song), 1991
 "Shine On (Shine All Your Sweet Love on Me)", by George Jones, 1983
 "Shine On You Crazy Diamond", originally performed as "Shine On", by Pink Floyd, 1975
 "Shine On", by The Amity Affliction, 2015
 "Shine On", by Badfinger from Badfinger, 1974
 "Shine On", by Bucks Fizz from Bucks Fizz, 1981
 "Shine On", by Chris de Burgh from Power of Ten, 1992
 "Shine On", by Gamma Ray from Somewhere Out in Space, 1997
 "Shine On", by May Erlewine
 "Shine On", by Needtobreathe from Daylight, 2006
 "Shine On", by Nik Kershaw from 15 Minutes, 1998
 "Shine On", by The Samples from the 1996 album Outpost, 1996
 "Shine On", by Simply Red from Big Love, 2015
 "Shine On", by Status Quo from Under the Influence, 1999
 "Shine On", by George Duke from Dream On, 1982